Naetrocymbe is a genus of fungi belonging to the family Naetrocymbaceae.

The genus has a cosmopolitan distribution.

Species
As accepted by Species Fungorum;
Naetrocymbe atomarioides 
Naetrocymbe atractospora 
Naetrocymbe cedrina 
Naetrocymbe depressa 
Naetrocymbe fraxini 
Naetrocymbe fuliginea 
Naetrocymbe herrei 
Naetrocymbe inspersa 
Naetrocymbe kentrospora 
Naetrocymbe lafoensiae 
Naetrocymbe massalongoana 
Naetrocymbe mauritiae 
Naetrocymbe megalospora 
Naetrocymbe nitescens 
Naetrocymbe perparum 
Naetrocymbe punctiformis 
Naetrocymbe quassiicola 
Naetrocymbe rhyponta 
Naetrocymbe robusta 
Naetrocymbe saxicola 

Former species;
N. fumago  = Naetrocymbe punctiformis
N. fuscoviridescens  = Pleomerium fuscoviridescens Meliolaceae family
N. quitensis  = Limacinia quitensis Capnodiaceae

References

Pleosporales
Dothideomycetes genera
Taxa described in 1865
Taxa named by Gustav Wilhelm Körber